Thuwanawaddy is a small town located in Thaton District, Mon State of Myanmar. The town was formed by combining nearby three village tracts, Kyaik Kaw, Thein Seik, and Taungkya.

References

Township capitals of Myanmar
Populated places in Mon State
Old Cities of Mon people